Thomas Stewart Rogers (born 3 March 1994) is an Australian cricketer. He is a right-arm fast bowler.

Rogers in the Futures League for the ACT Comets from the 2013–14 season to the 2016–17 season. He was offered a contract for Tasmania for the 2017–18 season. He made his List A debut for Tasmania in the 2017–18 JLT One-Day Cup on 7 October 2017. In March 2018, Cricket Australia named Rogers in their Sheffield Shield team of the year.

He made his Twenty20 debut for Hobart Hurricanes in the 2017–18 Big Bash League season on 30 December 2017. He switched to the Sydney Sixers in 2020-2021, back to the Hurricanes in 2021-2022, and to the Melbourne Renegades in 2022-2023.

Rogers holds Education and Arts degrees from the University of New South Wales and is a qualified secondary school teacher.

References

External links

Australian cricketers
1994 births
Living people
Tasmania cricketers
Hobart Hurricanes cricketers